Asswehly Sports Club is a Libyan football club based in Misurata City, Libya.
The club is playing in the Libyan Premier League for this season.

History
Asswehly Sports Club was founded on 28 May 1951 as The Workers Club, and then changes the name into:
Alislah: 17 November 1952
That Arremal: 30 June 1953
Alahly Misurata: 1954
Asswehly: 1972
Asswehly has got teams competing in different sports.
Asswehly Football, Futsal, Volleyball, Handball, Basketball teams have won many national competitions.
Asswehly Football Team is best ever finish is fourth in 2002–03, and the club once finished runners-up to the 2000 Libyan Cup, securing qualification to the 2000 Arab Cup Winner's Cup, where they withdrew in the first round.

Honours
Libyan Second Division: 12
1965, 1967, 1969, 1971, 1973, 1975, 1979, 1982, 1988, 1990, 1992, 1996

Libyan Cup: 0
Finalist: 1999-2000
Finalist: 1993-1994

Champion of Tripoli Province: 1
1962

Performance in UAFA competitions
Arab Cup Winners' Cup: 1 appearance
Arab Cup Winners' Cup 2002: Second Round

Coaching staff

External links
asoehle.itgo.com
asswehly.ly
Libyan Premier League 2017/2018
 Arab Cup Winners Cup 2002

 
Asswehly
Association football clubs established in 1944
1944 establishments in Libya